Kuiken is a surname of Dutch origin. Notable people with the surname include:

 Attje Kuiken (born 1977), Dutch politician
 Don Kuiken, American psychologist

References 

Dutch-language surnames